South Fork Township is one of eight townships in Audrain County, Missouri, United States. As of the 2010 census, its population was 5,431.

Geography
It contains three cemeteries: East Lawn Memorial, Lockridge and New Hope.

Blackmore Lake, Teal Lake and Timber Lake are within this township. The streams of Beaverdam Creek, Davis Creek, Elm Branch, Long Branch, Scattering Fork and Youngs Creek run through this township.

Transportation
South Fork Township contains one airport or landing strip, Mexico Memorial Airport.

References

 USGS Geographic Names Information System (GNIS)

External links
 US-Counties.com
 City-Data.com

Townships in Audrain County, Missouri
Townships in Missouri